Yuliang Zheng is the Chair of the Department of Computer and Information Sciences at the University of Alabama at Birmingham. He is best known for inventing the Signcryption cryptographic primitive that combines the digital signature and encryption operations into one single step. He also invented the HAVAL hash function, SPEED cipher, and STRANDOM pseudo-random number generator.

Zheng serves as Chief Technology Officer of Calyptix Security Corporation, a company he co-founded in 2002.

External links
Homepage of Yuliang Zheng

Yokohama National University alumni
Monash University alumni
University of North Carolina at Charlotte faculty
Living people
Year of birth missing (living people)
Modern cryptographers
Chinese cryptographers
American chief technology officers